Anthidium garleppi is a species of bee in the family Megachilidae, the leaf-cutter, carder, or mason bees.

Distribution
Bolivia
Ecuador
Peru

Synonyms
Synonyms for this species include:
Anthidium matucanense Cockerell, 1914
Anthidium melanotrichum var griseopilosum Friese, 1920

References

garleppi
Insects described in 1910